Ardian Pepa (born 2 March 1977, in Fushë-Arrëz) is an Albanian sculptor and painter. He graduated with a degree in sculpture from Tirana's Academy of Arts in 2001.

Work Experience and Exhibitions
 Participant in the Contemporary Art Fair at the International Center of Culture "Pjetër Arbnori", Tirana. (2006)
 Participant in the national competition "Skanderbeg".(2005)
 Director of Scenography for the realization of the play Marie Kraja. (2005)
 Scenography and realization of the scenes of "Miss Dea" theater "Byllis" Fier. (2005)
 Stage scenographer for "Miss Albania 2005" event held at Kaninë Castle of Vlora. (2005)
 Collective exhibition "Blic" in ICC-Tirana. (2003)
 Personal exhibition M.H.K "tendencies. (2003)
 Personal exhibition in the gallery of the Foundation "Velia". Broad thematic material of wood, metal, marble, alabaster, plaster, ceramics and drawing 33 works. (2002)
 Personal exhibition "Plus" in the Gallery of the Academy of Arts works in wood, metal, marble, alabaster, plaster, and various drawings. (2001)
 "Fight for Life" against AIDS Day December 1, in the gallery of the Academy of Arts. (2001)
 "Start" exhibition organized by the "Soros" with two jobs (wood and stone). In the Gallery of the Academy of Arts. (2001)
 Exhibition organized by the Orthodox Church in the Gallery of the Academy of Arts of Tirana. (2000)

References

1977 births
Living people
People from Fushë-Arrëz
Albanian sculptors